Kailashpur is a census town in Saharanpur district in the Indian state of Uttar Pradesh.

Demographics
 India census, Kailashpur had a population of 11,422. Males constitute 52.48% of the population and females 47.51%.  Kailashpur has an average literacy rate of 67.96%, lower than the national average of 74.04%: male literacy is 74.04%, and female literacy is 61.24%. In Kailashpur, 15.59% of the population is under 6 years of age.

References 

Cities and towns in Saharanpur district